Richard Rudgley (born 1961) is a British author and television presenter. He specialises on the topics of the usage of hallucinogens and intoxicants in society. He has also written about the Stone Age and about Paganism.
Rudgley completed a BA in Social anthropology and Religious studies and went on to do a M. St. and M. Phil. in Ethnology and Museum Ethnography at Oxford University.  He is married and lives in London.

Publications

Books
Rudgley's first book, The Alchemy of Culture: Intoxicants in Society (published in America under the title Essential Substances: A Cultural History of Intoxicants in Society) was the first winner of the Prometheus Award, launched by the British Museum Press in 1991.

His 1998 Lost Civilisations of the Stone Age addresses a popular audience. John Robb, reviewing it in Nature summarised it thus:Writing, surgery, drug use, monument building, detailed environmental knowledge, sophisticated artworks, technologies such as mining and smelting, language, musical instruments, tools fashioned with aesthetic sense as well as utilitarian function – all arose far earlier than either archaeologists have generally acknowledged or the public has imagined. The result is that we cannot consider our history as a simple story of the ‘rise’ from savage roots to a sophisticated present. Our ancestors, even tens of thousands of years ago, commanded surprising knowledge and expert skills.He goes on to indicate both the strengths and weakness of the book:As Rudgley points out, with examples of ancient ingenuity abounding, there is no need to turn to ancient astronauts to explain civilization.Rudgley almost always finds himself taking the minority view over controversies, and his conclusions are occasionally facile or follow discredited authorities. But throughout the book we find clear exposition, a refreshing straightforwardness about the complexity of the archaeological record, a willingness to explore many sides of an issue, and a zest for discovery that makes it a page-turner.He takes Rudgley to task over his excessive extension of the meanings of the word "civilization" and his tendency to sweeping statements, treating all early societies alike and representing the exceptional as typical. He concludes:The alternative (which Rudgley pursues within many chapters) would be to take societies on their own terms and look for the meaning of each invention within a society rather than checking it off on a list of traits of ‘civilization’. Prehistoric people did many weird and wonderful things; the way to read this book is as an entertaining and enlightening account of prehistory’s greatest hits.

In a review of the same work in Isis, however, archaeologist Denise Schmandt-Besserat is harshly critical, stating that Rudgley first fabricated a non-existent controversy about pre-historic cultures, then created heroes and villains by characterising archaeologists as "wicked morons who conspire to keep prehistory in obscurity". She suggests that Rudgley "uses data like a magician" picking data from all over the world and stretching back a million years to make his case and that "like the fancy gesturing of the magician that distracts the audience from the trick, the avalanche of erudition hides Rudgley's weak argumentation". She also criticises his use of the key terms 'prehistory' and 'civilisation', which he fails to define, arguing that he misuses them, and points out that he uses the term 'tribalism' to describe prehistoric cultures although we do not know if there were tribes in prehistory. She concludes that "One must grant that the alleged controversy and conspiracy, the simplistic plot and biased discussion, all help to make the book entertaining. The entertainment, however, comes at considerable cost", the cost being at the expense of the work of the prehistorians whose research made his book possible."

Rudgley's 2006 Pagan Resurrection, subtitled A Force for Evil or the Future of Western Spirituality?  posits the idea  that western civilisation, belief systems and attitudes have been formed by the "Odinic archetype". The influence of Christianity, he says, has been relatively recent and shallow. 
Rudgley spends much of the book emphasising the dark and violent side of Odin, according to Independent reviewer David V. Barrett, "committing the ultimate sin of any anthropologist or historian, back-projecting from highly selective examples of unpleasantness today and photo-fitting them to a distorted image from the mythological past". Barrett concludes that Rudgely's book is "a catalogue of racist individuals and organisations whose only connection with Odin, through very dubious links, is by assertion rather than argument."

Television
Lost Civilisations of the Stone Age was turned into a television series for Channel 4 entitled Secrets of the Stone Age.
He also presented Pagans in 2004.

The Financial Times review of the 2004 Pagans series commented how Rudgley "is keen to 'sex up' history ... You can see the glee of the programme makers when Richard revealed the ingredients for his new four-part series – pagan rituals (naked maidens a speciality), bestiality, free love, violence, nudity."
The Times reviewer Joe Joseph remarked that Rudgley's "revelations" of how Stone Age people and "barbarians" were clever, and how "we were all pagans once" were statements of the obvious..."

In 2006, Channel 4 broadcast another documentary presented by Rudgley entitled The Celts, which investigates the Celtic peoples of the British Isles and mainland Europe. The legend of King Arthur, the mysticism of the Druids, and warriors such as Boudica and Vercingetorix are covered as the programme attempts to unpick the facts from the fiction, about an ethnic group that were ultimately crushed by the might of Rome's legions.

Rudgley was also a writer on the 2002 Discovery Channel TV series Barbarians, Secrets of the Dark Ages.

Personal life
Rudgley moved to London in the early 1980s and worked as a shop assistant in WHSmith in Notting Hill, and later as a hotel porter in Holland Park, later showing interest in a number of modern Pagan groups, but never becoming a member of any single organisation. When undertaking fieldwork in China, he was accused of espionage on behalf of the British authorities by the Chinese government.

Bibliography
1991, Alchemy of Culture: Intoxicants in Society 
1998, Lost Civilisations of the Stone Age 
1999, Encyclopedia of Psychoactive Substances 
2000, Secrets of the Stone Age 
2001, Wildest Dreams: An Anthology of Drug-Related Literature 
2002, Barbarians: Secrets of the Dark Ages 
2006, Pagan Resurrection

References

External links
Pagans homepage

Alumni of St Cross College, Oxford
British anthropologists
British television presenters
British writers
Living people
1961 births
English modern pagans
Modern pagan writers